Bending of plates, or plate bending, refers to the deflection of a plate perpendicular to the plane of the plate under the action of external forces and moments.  The amount of deflection can be determined by solving the differential equations of an appropriate plate theory.  The stresses in the plate can be calculated from these deflections.  Once the stresses are known, failure theories can be used to determine whether a plate will fail under a given load.

Bending of Kirchhoff-Love plates

Definitions 

For a thin rectangular plate of thickness , Young's modulus , and Poisson's ratio , we can define parameters in terms of the plate deflection, .

The flexural rigidity is given by

Moments 
The bending moments per unit length are given by

The twisting moment per unit length is given by

Forces 

The shear forces per unit length are given by

Stresses 

The bending stresses are given by

The shear stress is given by

Strains 

The bending strains for small-deflection theory are given by

The shear strain for small-deflection theory is given by

For large-deflection plate theory, we consider the inclusion of membrane strains

Deflections 

The deflections are given by

Derivation 
In the Kirchhoff–Love plate theory for  plates the governing equations are

and

In expanded form,

and

The quantity  has units of force per unit length.  The quantity  has units of moment per unit length.

For isotropic, homogeneous, plates with Young's modulus  and Poisson's ratio  these equations reduce to

where  is the deflection of the mid-surface of the plate.

Small deflection of thin rectangular plates 

This is governed by the Germain-Lagrange plate equation

This equation was first derived by Lagrange in December 1811 in correcting the work of Germain who provided the basis of the theory.

Large deflection of thin rectangular plates 

This is governed by the Föppl–von Kármán plate equations

where  is the stress function.

Circular Kirchhoff-Love plates
The bending of circular plates can be examined by solving the governing equation with 
appropriate boundary conditions.  These solutions were first found by Poisson in 1829.
Cylindrical coordinates are convenient for such problems. Here  is the distance of a point from the midplane of the plate.

The governing equation in coordinate-free form is

In cylindrical coordinates , 

For symmetrically loaded circular plates, and we have

Therefore, the governing equation is

where  are constants.  The slope of the deflection surface is

For a circular plate, the requirement that the deflection and the slope of the deflection are finite 
at  implies that . However,  need not equal 0, as the limit 
of  exists as you approach  from the right.

Clamped edges
the plate (radius ).  Using these boundary conditions we get

The in-plane displacements in the plate are

The in-plane strains in the plate are

The in-plane stresses in the plate are

have

The moment resultants (bending moments) are 

where .  The bending moments at the boundary and the center of the plate are

Rectangular Kirchhoff-Love plates

For rectangular plates, Navier in 1820 introduced a simple method for finding the displacement and stress when a plate is simply supported. The idea was to express the applied load in terms of Fourier components, find the solution for a sinusoidal load (a single Fourier component), and then superimpose the Fourier components to get the solution for an arbitrary load.

Sinusoidal load
Let us assume that the load is of the form

Here  is the amplitude,  is the width of the plate in the -direction, and
 is the width of the plate in the -direction.

Since the plate is simply supported, the displacement  along the edges of

If we apply these boundary conditions and solve the plate equation, we get the
solution 

Where D is the flexural rigidity 

Analogous to flexural stiffness EI. We can calculate the stresses and strains in the plate once we know the displacement.

For a more general load of the form

Navier solution

Double trigonometric series equation 

We define a general load  of the following form

where  is a Fourier coefficient given by
.
The classical rectangular plate equation for small deflections thus becomes:

Simply-supported plate with general load 

We assume a solution  of the following form

The partial differentials of this function are given by

Substituting these expressions in the plate equation, we have

Equating the two expressions, we have

which can be rearranged to give

The deflection of a simply-supported plate (of corner-origin) with general load is given by

Simply-supported plate with uniformly-distributed load 

For a uniformly-distributed load, we have

The corresponding Fourier coefficient is thus given by
.
Evaluating the double integral, we have
,
or alternatively in a piecewise format, we have

The deflection of a simply-supported plate (of corner-origin) with uniformly-distributed load is given by

The bending moments per unit length in the plate are given by

Lévy solution
Another approach was proposed by Lévy in 1899. In this case we start with an assumed form of the displacement and try to fit the parameters so that the governing equation and the boundary conditions are satisfied.

Let us assume that

Moments along edges
Consider the case of pure moment loading.  In that case  and
 has to satisfy .  Since we are working in rectangular
Cartesian coordinates, the governing equation can be expanded as

or

This is an ordinary differential equation which has the general solution

where  are constants that can be determined from the boundary 
conditions.  Therefore, the displacement solution has the form

Let us choose the coordinate system such that the boundaries of the plate are
).  Then the moment boundary conditions at the  boundaries are

where  are known functions.  The solution can be found by 
applying these boundary conditions.  We can show that for the symmetrical case
where 

and

we have

where

Similarly, for the antisymmetrical case where

we have

We can superpose the symmetric and antisymmetric solutions to get more general
solutions.

Simply-supported plate with uniformly-distributed load 

For a uniformly-distributed load, we have

The deflection of a simply-supported plate with centre  with uniformly-distributed load is given by

The bending moments per unit length in the plate are given by

Uniform and symmetric moment load 

The resulting displacement is

where 

The bending moments and shear forces corresponding to the displacement  are

The stresses are

Cylindrical plate bending 
Cylindrical bending occurs when a rectangular plate that has dimensions , where  and the thickness  is small, is subjected to a uniform distributed load perpendicular to the plane of the plate.  Such a plate takes the shape of the surface of a cylinder.

Simply supported plate with axially fixed ends 
For a simply supported plate under cylindrical bending with edges that are free to rotate but have a fixed .  Cylindrical bending solutions can be found using the Navier and Levy techniques.

Bending of thick Mindlin plates
For thick plates, we have to consider the effect of through-the-thickness shears on the orientation of the normal to the mid-surface after deformation.  Raymond D. Mindlin's theory provides one approach for find the deformation and stresses in such plates.  Solutions to Mindlin's theory can be derived from the equivalent Kirchhoff-Love solutions using canonical relations.

Governing equations
The canonical governing equation for isotropic thick plates can be expressed as

where  is the applied transverse load,  is the shear modulus, 
is the bending rigidity,  is the plate thickness, 
 is the shear correction factor,  is the Young's modulus,  is the Poisson's 
ratio, and

In Mindlin's theory,  is the transverse displacement of the mid-surface of the plate
The canonical parameters for this theory
The shear correction factor  usually has the
value .

The solutions to the governing equations can be found if one knows the corresponding 
Kirchhoff-Love solutions by using the relations

where  is the displacement predicted for a Kirchhoff-Love plate,  is a 
biharmonic function such that ,  is a function that satisfies the 
Laplace equation, and

Simply supported rectangular plates
For simply supported plates, the Marcus moment sum vanishes, i.e.,

Which is almost Laplace`s equation for w[ref 6].
related to the corresponding Kirchhoff solution by

Bending of Reissner-Stein cantilever plates 

Solution of this system of two ODEs gives

where .  The bending moments and shear forces corresponding to the displacement 
 are

The stresses are

If the applied load at the edge is constant, we recover the solutions for a beam under a
concentrated end load.

See also 
Bending
Infinitesimal strain theory
Kirchhoff–Love plate theory
Linear elasticity
Mindlin–Reissner plate theory
Plate theory
Stress (mechanics)
Stress resultants
Structural acoustics
Vibration of plates

References 

Continuum mechanics